Corbet is a surname, and may refer to

A
 Alexander Steven Corbet (1896–1948), British chemist and naturalist. 
 Andrew Corbet (1522–1578), English Protestant politician of the mid-Tudor and early Elizabethan periods
 Andrew Corbet (1580–1637), English politician

B
 Brady Corbet (born 1988), American actor

C
 Charles-Louis Corbet (1758–1808), French sculptor
 Christian Cardell Corbet (born 1966), Canadian painter and sculptor
 Clement Corbet (c. 1576–1652), English jurist

D
 Denys Corbet (1826–1909), Guernsey poet

E
 Edith Corbet née Edenborough (1846–1920), Victorian landscape painter
 Edward Corbet (died 1658), English clergyman, member of the Westminster Assembly

F
 Freda Corbet (1900–1993), British politician

G
 St George Corbet Gore (1849–1913), English army officer and Surveyor General of India

H
 Henry Corbet (1820–1878), English agricultural writer, editor of the weekly The Mark Lane Express Agricultural Journal

J
 Jean-Charles Corbet, contemporary French Chief executive officer and Aviator
 Jerome Corbet (1530s–1598), Elizabethan politician and lawyer 
 John Corbet (disambiguation) – several people

K
 Kathleen Corbet (born 1960), American businesswoman
 Ken Corbet, contemporary American politician, member of the Kansas House of Representatives

L
 Leo Corbet (1936-2019), American lawyer and politician

M
 Matthew Ridley Corbet (1850–1902), Victorian neoclassical painter
 Miles Corbet (1595–1662), English politician and Regicide
 Moses Corbet (1728–1814), British Army officer who served as Lieutenant Governor of Jersey

P
 Philip Steven Corbet (1929–2008), British entomologist

R
 Reginald Corbet (by 1513–1566), English lawyer in the mid-Tudor period
 René Corbet (born 1973), Canadian ice hockey player
 Richard Corbet (disambiguation) – several people
 Robert Corbet (disambiguation) – several people
 Roger Corbet (disambiguation) – several people

V
 Vincent Corbet (disambiguation) – several people

W
 William Corbet (disambiguation) – several people

See also

 Corbett (surname) an alternate spelling for "Corbet" from the Norman name "Corbé", migrating from Normandy, France to England and Scotland, where it is occasionally spelled Corbet or Corbett.
 Courbet (disambiguation)

  
 Corbet Family 
 Corbet Baronets 
 Barony of Caus 
 Corbet, Northern Ireland